Hanover is an unincorporated community in the Baltimore/Annapolis area in northwestern Anne Arundel County and eastern Howard County in the U.S. state of Maryland, located south of Baltimore.

The community is located approximately at the intersection of Maryland State Highway 100 and the Baltimore–Washington Parkway. It is part of the Baltimore-Washington Metropolitan Combined Statistical Area and is located just southwest of the Baltimore-Washington International Thurgood Marshall Airport (commonly known as "BWI"). It is bordered by Severn to the south, Linthicum to the east, and Elkridge to the north and west.

History
In the past, the community also consisted of "Anderson", a post office stop founded along the B&O tracks from 1874–1881 along modern Anderson Avenue, and operated as "Hanoverville" until December 1896.

Hanover is located along the fall line where the ocean met the shore in prehistoric times. Native American tribes lived along the lower Patapsco river. archeological digs in 1929 have discovered arrowheads, spearpoints, axes, and gorgets along the Disney farm. The area is now occupied by commercial buildings along Hi Tech drive and Oxford Square development.

Arundel Mills mall opened in November 2000. Since then, the area has seen explosive growth; shopping centers and housing developments have popped up along Arundel Mills Boulevard (Route 713), which links the B-W Parkway and Route 100 to Arundel Mills. In August 2010, Preston Partners sought to rezone a failed commercial project on the historic Disney farm into a transit-oriented development funded by Magic Johnson. On November 2, 2010, Anne Arundel County voters approved zoning for a gaming and entertainment complex with 4,750 slot machines at Arundel Mills Mall. This casino complex opened as Maryland Live! in June 2012. The Maryland Department of Transportation is headquartered at 7201 Corporate Center Drive, which has a Hanover address.  Amazon has operated a distribution warehouse in Hanover since 2018.

Demographics

According to the 2014–2018 American Community Survey by the United States Census Bureau, Hanover has a median household income of $116,098. 49% of the residents are white, 28% are Black or African-American, 13% are Asian, 5% are Hispanic, and 5% of residents are two or more races. Hanover has the largest percentage of Asian-Americans of any community in Anne Arundel County.

In 2017, Hanover was named as one of the 50 most expensive zip-codes in the state of Maryland, ranking as number 44. Hanover was the 6th most expensive zip-code in Anne Arundel County, being only behind Gibson Island, West River, Davidsonville, Severna Park, and Gambrills.

Schools

Hanover is served by the Anne Arundel County Public Schools and Howard County Public Schools system.

Howard County: 
Hanover Hills Elementary School [Grades K-5]
Thomas Viaduct Middle School [Grades 6-8]
Long Reach High School [Grades 9-12]

Anne Arundel County: 
Frank Hebron Harman Elementary School [Grades K-5]
Macarthur Middle School [Grades 6-8] 
Meade High School [Grades 9-12]
Lindale Middle School [Grades 6-8][For Magnet Program only, must be accepted through application] 
Brooklyn Park Middle School [Grades 6-8] [For Magnet Program only, must be accepted through application]
Annapolis High School [Grades 9-12] [For Magnet Program only, must be accepted through application]
Broadneck High School [Grades 9-12] [For Magnet Program only, must be accepted through application]
Glen Burnie High School [Grades 9-12] [For Magnet Program only, must be accepted through application]
North County High School [Grades 9-12] [For Magnet Program only, must be accepted through application]

Real estate developments
 Arundel Mills Mall and Maryland Live! casino
 Hawks Ridge/Forest Ridge, a large community with medium and large single family homes, constructed by Ryan Homes from the 1990s – mid 2000s.
 Dorsey Ridge Luxury Apartments and Villas – opened in 2013
 Parkside Townhomes
 Stoney Run Garden condominiums
 Villages of Dorchester, a residential development
 Arundel Preserve, a mixed-use development that at completion will include about two million square feet of office space, 500 apartments, 440 homes,  of retail space, and two hotels near Arundel Mills mall.
Ridge Forest, constructed by Ryan Homes in the 1990s
 Ridgefield I and II, constructed by Rice Homes and Washington Homes in the late 1970s and early 1980s
 Ridgewood, constructed by Washington Homes in the early 1980s featuring homes with  lots
 Shipley Homestead, a residential development
 Ridge Retreat, constructed by Baldwin Homes from 2019 to 2020

References

External links
 

Unincorporated communities in Anne Arundel County, Maryland
Populated places established in 1862
1862 establishments in Maryland